TNNI3 interacting kinase is a protein that in humans is encoded by the TNNI3K gene.

Function 

This gene encodes a protein that belongs to the MAP kinase kinase kinase (MAPKKK) family of protein kinases. The protein contains ankyrin repeat, protein kinase and serine-rich domains and is thought to play a role in cardiac physiology.

Clinical significance

Mutations in TNNI3K are associated to cardiomyopathies.

References

Further reading